The 2015–16 Scottish League Cup was the 70th season of Scotland's second-most prestigious football knockout competition. It is also known as The Scottish League Cup presented by Utilita for sponsorship reasons.

Ross County defeated Hibernian 2–1 in the final on 13 March.

Format
The competition is a single elimination knock-out competition. In each round, fixtures are determined by random draw, with the first to third rounds seeded according to last season's league positions (higher 50% of finishers drawn v lower 50% of finishers, alternating which is at home with each tie drawn).

Fixtures are played to a finish, with extra time and then penalties used in the event of draws. The competition is open to all clubs in the Scottish Professional Football League. Clubs involved in European competitions are given a bye to the third round to avoid congestion of fixtures.

Qualified teams

The following teams qualified and competed in the 2015–16 Scottish League Cup.

Scottish Premiership teams
There are 12 teams from the 2014–15 Scottish Premiership.

Aberdeen
Celtic
Dundee
Dundee United
Hamilton Academical
Inverness CT
Kilmarnock
Motherwell
Partick Thistle
Ross County
St Johnstone
St Mirren

Scottish Championship teams
There are 10 teams from the 2014–15 Scottish Championship.

Alloa Athletic
Cowdenbeath
Dumbarton
Falkirk
Heart of Midlothian
Hibernian
Livingston
Queen of the South
Raith Rovers
Rangers

Scottish League One teams
There are 10 teams from the 2014–15 Scottish League One.

Airdrieonians
Ayr United
Brechin City
Dunfermline Athletic
Forfar Athletic
Greenock Morton
Peterhead
Stenhousemuir
Stirling Albion
Stranraer

Scottish League Two teams
There are 10 teams from the 2014–15 Scottish League Two.

Albion Rovers
Annan Athletic
Arbroath
Berwick Rangers
Clyde
East Fife
East Stirlingshire
Elgin City
Montrose
Queen's Park

First round

The first round draw took place on Monday 6 July 2015 at 2:30pm BST at the Hampden Park Stadium. The 30 clubs that participated in the Championship, League One and League Two in the 2014–15 season entered the competition at this stage. The 12 clubs that participated in the 2014–15 Scottish Premiership received a bye.

Draw and Seeding

Matches

Second round

The second round draw took place on Monday 3 August 2015 at 2:30pm BST at the Hampden Park Stadium. The clubs that finished in the bottom 7 places of last season's Premiership entered at this stage joining the 15 first round winners.

Draw and Seeding

Matches

Third round
The third round draw took place on Thursday 27 August 2015 at 2:30pm BST at the Hampden Park Stadium. The 4 clubs that participated in the 2014–15 Scottish Premiership season and qualified for European competition entered the competition at this stage along with Dundee United, the highest placed non-Europe qualifying side.

Draw and Seeding

Matches

Quarter-finals

Draw and Seeding

The quarter-final draw took place on Monday 28 September 2015 at 2:30pm at Hampden Park, all teams were placed in the same pot.

Matches

Semi-finals

Draw and seeding

The semi-final draw took place on Monday 9 November 2015 at 2:00pm at Hampden Park, all teams were placed in the same pot.

Matches

Final

Statistics

Top goalscorers

References

External links
 Scottish Professional Football League – League Cup official website

Scottish League Cup seasons
League Cup
2015–16 in Scottish football cups